Disney's Brother Bear is a video game released by Disney as a tie-in to the 2003 theatrical film Brother Bear. It was released in 2003: November 4 for Game Boy Advance, November 21 for Microsoft Windows, and for mobile phones.

Development
The PC version is a 3D platform game published by Disney Interactive and released on November 11, 2003.

The Game Boy Advance version was released on November 4, 2003. It is a platforming game that was published by Disney Interactive and developed by Vicarious Visions.

Reception

PC version
AceGamez rated the game 6 out of 10, GameZone rated it 7 out of 10, PC Format UK rated it 27 out of 100, and PC Gamer UK rated it 62 out of 100. Childrenssoftware.com gave the game 4.5/5, writing: "The humor and adventure make the transition from large to small screen nicely. Although the game is marketed to kids ages 6 and older, the gameplay can be challenging. Our nine to fourteen year old testers liked the game". jkdmedia of Gamezone said: "This game appears to be a fun, action packed game, with lots of cool mini-games that can be played independently. I say 'appear', because frankly, due to many technical issues in running the game, we didn't get all the way through the game. There is a lot of game here, though, with plenty of easy exploration and item collecting". SuperKids gave the game a 3.0 for Educational Value, 4.0 for Kid Appeal, and 5.0 for Ease of Use. It said: "While Brother Bear is a fun-packed game that reinforces the importance of friendship and listening, it does not address the classic 3 R's", and noted "even if kids have not seen Disney's Brother Bear movie, they will enjoy this fun adventure".

GBA version
GameZone rated the game 8 out of 10, Nintendo Power rated it 3.3 out of 5, and Nintendojo rated it 6.6 out of 10.

References

2003 video games
Brother Bear
Disney video games
Game Boy Advance games
Mobile games
Platform games
Single-player video games
Unreal Engine games
Vicarious Visions games
Video games about bears
Video games based on films
Video games developed in the United States
Video games set in Alaska
Windows games
Amaze Entertainment games
3D platform games